Almaguer is a town and municipality in the Cauca Department, Colombia.

Founded in 1551 by Vasco de Guzmán and Alonso de Fuenmayor, the municipality covers an area of 520 km2 and has a population of 21,300. The population is primarily engaged in agriculture.

Notable residents 
Manuel María Paz Delgado

References

Municipalities of Cauca Department
1551 establishments in the Spanish Empire